The Kiss of Judas is a 1988 Italian religious drama film written, directed and produced by Paolo Benvenuti, at his feature film debut. It was screened at the 45th Venice International Film Festival in the Critics' Week section.

Cast 
 Carlo Bachi as The Nazarene
 Giorgio Algranti as Judas
 Emidio Simini as Nicodemus
 Marina Bersotti as The Magdalen
 Pio Gianelli as Simon Peter

References

External links

1988 films
1988 drama films
Italian drama films
Films directed by Paolo Benvenuti
Portrayals of Jesus in film
1988 directorial debut films
Cultural depictions of Judas Iscariot
Portrayals of Mary Magdalene in film
Cultural depictions of Saint Peter
1980s Italian-language films
1980s Italian films